The Ekofisk Formation is a geological formation of Danian (lowermost Paleocene) age. It forms the uppermost part of the Chalk Group in the North Sea. It is an important reservoir for oil and gas in fields such as Ekofisk. It overlies the Maastrichtian Tor Formation with local evidence of unconformity. It underlies the Våle Formation.

References

Geology of the North Sea